Taxocrinus is an extinct genus of crinoids.

Fossil records
This genus is known in the fossil record from the Silurian period to the Carboniferous period (age range: from 428.2 to 326.4 million years ago).  These fossils have been found in United Kingdom, United States, Australia, China, the Czech Republic and Germany.

Species
 Taxocrinus anomalus Waters et al. 2003
 Taxocrinus macrodactylus Phillips 1841
 Taxocrinus stultus Whidborne 1896
 Taxocrinus telleri Springer, 1920

References 

See also List of crinoid genera

Taxocrinida
Prehistoric crinoid genera